Claude-Joseph Gignoux (1890–1968) was a French politician. He served as a member of the Chamber of Deputies from 1928 to 1932, representing Loire.
Gignoux became an undersecretary of state.
In 1936 he was director of the Journée Industrielle.

On 9 October 1936 the Confédération générale du patronat français (CGPF) held a general assembly to elect its new board.
Gignoux was elected president.
He proved an energetic leader.
He said that employers must not try to avoid their responsibilities, but must confirm their authority through united action.
In the early part of 1939 Gigoux warned the CGPF members of the danger of government demands to rehire workers who had been fired after the general strike, since this would only lead to further government intervention.
He urged industrialists to make the present arrangement work, since socialism was the only alternative.

References

Sources

External links
 

1890 births
1968 deaths
Politicians from Lyon
Democratic and Social Action politicians
Members of the 14th Chamber of Deputies of the French Third Republic
People of Vichy France
20th-century French journalists
French economists
Members of the Académie des sciences morales et politiques